Gladden Dye Jr. (born c. 1934) is a former American football coach.  He was the 13th head football coach at Northwest Missouri State University in Maryville, Missouri, serving for five seasons, from 1971 to 1975, and compiling a record of 32–17.  Dye attended William Jewell College, where he lettered in football for three years.

Head coaching record

College

References

Year of birth missing (living people)
1930s births
Living people
Northwest Missouri State Bearcats football coaches
William Jewell Cardinals football players
High school football coaches in Missouri